A Sun-synchronous orbit (SSO), also called a heliosynchronous orbit, is a nearly polar orbit around a planet, in which the satellite passes over any given point of the planet's surface at the same local mean solar time. More technically, it is an orbit arranged so that it precesses through one complete revolution each year, so it always maintains the same relationship with the Sun.

Applications 
A Sun-synchronous orbit is useful for imaging, reconnaissance, and weather satellites, because every time that the satellite is overhead, the surface illumination angle on the planet underneath it is nearly the same. This consistent lighting is a useful characteristic for satellites that image the Earth's surface in visible or infrared wavelengths, such as weather and spy satellites, and for other remote-sensing satellites, such as those carrying ocean and atmospheric remote-sensing instruments that require sunlight. For example, a satellite in Sun-synchronous orbit might ascend across the equator twelve times a day, each time at approximately 15:00 mean local time.

Special cases of the Sun-synchronous orbit are the noon/midnight orbit, where the local mean solar time of passage for equatorial latitudes is around noon or midnight, and the dawn/dusk orbit, where the local mean solar time of passage for equatorial latitudes is around sunrise or sunset, so that the satellite rides the terminator between day and night. Riding the terminator is useful for active radar satellites, as the satellites' solar panels can always see the Sun, without being shadowed by the Earth. It is also useful for some satellites with passive instruments that need to limit the Sun's influence on the measurements, as it is possible to always point the instruments towards the night side of the Earth. The dawn/dusk orbit has been used for solar-observing scientific satellites such as TRACE, Hinode and PROBA-2, affording them a nearly continuous view of the Sun.

Orbital precession 
A Sun-synchronous orbit is achieved by having the osculating orbital plane precess (rotate) approximately one degree eastward each day with respect to the celestial sphere to keep pace with the Earth's movement around the Sun. This precession is achieved by tuning the inclination to the altitude of the orbit (see Technical details) such that Earth's equatorial bulge, which perturbs inclined orbits, causes the orbital plane of the spacecraft to precess with the desired rate. The plane of the orbit is not fixed in space relative to the distant stars, but rotates slowly about the Earth's axis.

This is slightly retrograde compared to the direction of Earth's rotation: 0° represents an equatorial orbit, and 90° represents a polar orbit.

Sun-synchronous orbits are possible around other oblate planets, such as Mars. A satellite orbiting a planet such as Venus that is almost spherical will need an outside push to maintain a Sun-synchronous orbit.

Technical details 
The angular precession per orbit for an Earth orbiting satellite is given by
  
where
  is the coefficient for the second zonal term related to the oblateness of the Earth,
  is the mean radius of the Earth,
  is the semi-latus rectum of the orbit,
  is the inclination of the orbit to the equator.

An orbit will be Sun-synchronous when the precession rate  equals the mean motion of the Earth about the Sun, which is 360° per sidereal year, so we must set , where  is the orbital period.

As the orbital period of a spacecraft is
 

 

or when  is 360° per year,
 

As an example, with  = , i.e., for an altitude  ≈  of the spacecraft over Earth's surface, this formula gives a Sun-synchronous inclination of 98.7°.

Note that according to this approximation  equals −1 when the semi-major axis equals , which means that only lower orbits can be Sun-synchronous. The period can be in the range from 88 minutes for a very low orbit ( = ,  = 96°) to 3.8 hours ( = , but this orbit would be equatorial, with  = 180°). A period longer than 3.8 hours may be possible by using an eccentric orbit with  <  but  > .

If one wants a satellite to fly over some given spot on Earth every day at the same hour, the satellite must complete a whole number of orbits per day. Assuming a circular orbit, this comes down to between 7 and 16 orbits per day, as doing less than 7 orbits would require an altitude above the maximum for a Sun-synchronous orbit, and doing more than 16 would require an orbit inside the Earth's atmosphere or surface. The resulting valid orbits are shown in the following table. (The table has been calculated assuming the periods given. The orbital period that should be used is actually slightly longer. For instance, a retrograde equatorial orbit that passes over the same spot after 24 hours has a true period about  ≈ 1.0027 times longer than the time between overpasses. For non-equatorial orbits the factor is closer to 1.)

 {| class="wikitable" style="text-align:right;"
! Orbits per day
! colspan=2 | Period (h)
! Altitude (km)
! Maximal latitude
! Inclin-ation
|-
| 16 ||    || = 1:30 || 274 || 83.4° || 96.6°
|-
| 15 ||    || = 1:36 || 567 || 82.3° || 97.7°
|-
| 14 ||    || ≈ 1:43 ||  894 || 81.0° ||  99.0°
|-
| 13 ||  || ≈ 1:51 || 1262 || 79.3° || 100.7°
|-
| 12 || 2                 ||        || 1681 || 77.0° || 103.0°
|-
| 11 ||   || ≈ 2:11 || 2162 || 74.0° || 106.0°
|-
| 10 ||    || = 2:24 || 2722 || 69.9° || 110.1°
|-
| 9 ||     || = 2:40 || 3385 || 64.0° || 116.0°
|-
| 8 || 3                  ||        || 4182 || 54.7° || 125.3°
|-
| 7 ||     || ≈ 3:26 || 5165 || 37.9° || 142.1°
|}

When one says that a Sun-synchronous orbit goes over a spot on the Earth at the same local time each time, this refers to mean solar time, not to apparent solar time. The Sun will not be in exactly the same position in the sky during the course of the year (see Equation of time and Analemma).

Even if an orbit remains Sun-synchronous, however, other orbital parameters such as argument of periapsis and the orbital eccentricity evolve, due to higher-order perturbations in the Earth's gravitational field, the pressure of sunlight, and other causes. Earth observation satellites, in particular, prefer orbits with constant altitude when passing over the same spot. Careful selection of eccentricity and location of perigee reveals specific combinations where the rate of change of perturbations are minimized, and hence the orbit is relatively stable a frozen orbit, where the motion of position of the periapsis is stable. The ERS-1, ERS-2 and Envisat of European Space Agency, as well as the MetOp spacecraft of EUMETSAT and RADARSAT-2 of the Canadian Space Agency, are all operated in such Sun-synchronous frozen orbits.

See also 

 Orbital perturbation analysis (spacecraft) 
 Analemma
 Geosynchronous orbit
 Geostationary orbit
 List of orbits
 Polar orbit
 World Geodetic System

References

Further reading 
 Sandwell, David T., The Gravity Field of the Earth - Part 1 (2002) (p. 8)
 Sun-Synchronous Orbit dictionary entry, from U.S. Centennial of Flight Commission
 NASA Q&A

External links 
 List of satellites in Sun-synchronous orbit

Earth orbits
Satellites in low Earth orbit